Definitely, Maybe is a 2008 romantic comedy film written and directed by Adam Brooks, and starring Ryan Reynolds, Isla Fisher, Rachel Weisz, Elizabeth Banks, Abigail Breslin, and Kevin Kline. Set in New York City, the film is about a former political consultant who tries to help his daughter understand his impending divorce by telling her the story of his past romantic relationships and how he ended up marrying her mother. The film grossed $56 million worldwide.

Plot
Will Hayes works at an advertising agency in New York City and is in the midst of a divorce from wife Sarah. After her first sex education class, his 10-year-old daughter Maya insists on hearing the story of how her parents met. Will gives in, but changes the names and some of the facts, leaving Maya to guess which of the women from his past is Sarah, her mother.

In 1992, Will graduates from the University of Wisconsin–Madison and leaves behind his college sweetheart, "Emily Jones", to work on the Bill Clinton campaign in New York City. There, he meets "April Hoffman", a fellow campaign staffer, and delivers a package from Emily to her college friend, "Summer Hartley". The package is revealed to be Summer's diary, which Will reads, learning she had a brief affair with Emily. Summer is dating her professor, Hampton Roth, but spontaneously kisses Will.

He tells April his plan to propose to Emily, and rehearses his proposal; April replies, "Definitely, maybe." They go to her apartment where Will notices her many copies of Jane Eyre. She explains that her father gave her a copy with a personal inscription shortly before he died, but the book was later lost. She has spent years searching secondhand bookstores to find it and collects any copy with an inscription. April and Will kiss, but he abruptly leaves. The following day Emily arrives but when Will tries to propose, she confesses that she slept with his roommate, and urges him to move on and pursue his ambitions.

After Clinton is elected, Will opens a political consulting firm, and stays in close touch with April as she travels the world. He encounters Summer, now a journalist and single, and they begin a relationship. April returns from abroad, planning to tell Will that she loves him, but discovers he is planning to propose to Summer. Will learns that Summer has written an article that will ruin his candidate's campaign. He asks her not to publish it, but she refuses, and Will ends their relationship. The article derails the campaign, losing Will his political career and friends.

Years later, April reaches out to Will, who has fallen into depression. She throws Will a birthday party, reuniting him with his old colleagues, but he quietly leaves the party early. Will then drunkenly confesses to April that he loves her, leading to an argument about the state of their lives. Passing a bookstore, he finds the inscribed copy of Jane Eyre April's father gave her. He goes to April's apartment to give her the book but decides against it when he meets her boyfriend Kevin, who is living with her. Will runs into Summer who tells him she's pregnant and invites him to a party where he reunites with Emily, who has recently moved to New York City.

In the present, Maya deduces that "Emily" is her mother. Maya hopes her parents will reunite, but Will assures Maya that she is the story's happy ending, before finalizing his divorce.

Unpacking in his new apartment, Will discovers April's book. He brings it to her, apologizing for waiting so long, but she asks him to leave. At Maya's urging, Will realizes he is miserable without April, whose name he didn't change in the story like he did to "Emily"/Sarah and to "Summer", whose real name is Natasha. Will and Maya go to April's apartment, and he tries to explain his reasoning to her, but she does not let them inside. Waiting in front of the door, Maya encourages Will to tell April the story, while April overhears the conversation through intercom. As Will and Maya walk away, April runs after them. Will explains that he kept the book as the only thing he had left of her. April invites them in to tell her the story, and she and Will kiss.

Cast

Music
The film was scored by English composer Clint Mansell. Lakeshore Records released the score on March 18, 2008. All Music Guide reviewer William Ruhlmann praised the album as filled with "sweet, melodic numbers that often seem to lack only a lyric to turn them into pop songs". He also stated that it functioned as "light accompaniment to an equally light entertainment".

A song from Nirvana, "Come as You Are", was featured during several scenes in the movie, as well as Nothing Lasts Forever by Maroon 5.

Release
In its opening weekend, the film grossed $9.8 million from 2,204 theaters in the United States and Canada, ranking #5 at the box office. It went on to gross $56 million worldwide.

The film was released on DVD June 24, 2008, with a widescreen transfer, deleted scenes, two short featurettes, and a commentary track by Reynolds and director Brooks.

Reception 
On Rotten Tomatoes the film has an approval rating of 70% based on reviews from 148 critics, with an average rating of 6.5/10. The site's consensus reads: "With a clever script and charismatic leads, Definitely, Maybe is a refreshing entry into the romantic comedy genre." On Metacritic the film has an average score of 59 out of 100 based on 33 reviews, indicating "mixed or average reviews". Audiences polled by CinemaScore gave the film an average grade of "B+" on an A+ to F scale.

Dennis Harvey of Variety magazine called it "A pleasingly non-formulaic romantic seriocomedy, Definitely, Maybe has charm and some depth, even if it’s ultimately more a third-base hit than a home run."
A.O. Scott of The New York Times called it "A nimble and winning little romance".
Claudia Puig of USA Today gave it a positive review and wrote: "It's generally enjoyable, amusing and more sophisticated than most films in this genre."

Stephen Farber The Hollywood Reporter gave a more mixed review but praised the cast: "The film is far from a complete washout, and this is chiefly a tribute to its immensely attractive and appealing cast. Ryan Reynolds proves to have the stuff of a true leading man."

Caroline Siede of The A.V. Club reviewed the film in 2021 and called it "underrated" and noted it as a development in career of Ryan Reynolds as he "traded snark for sincerity." Siede said the plot was "essentially How I Met Your Mother with a dash of High Fidelity" but praised the film for "breath[ing] new life into old formulas without throwing the rest of the genre under the bus."

References

External links
 
 

2008 films
2008 romantic comedy-drama films
English-language German films
German coming-of-age comedy-drama films
German romantic comedy-drama films
British coming-of-age comedy-drama films
British romantic comedy-drama films
American coming-of-age comedy-drama films
American romantic comedy-drama films
English-language French films
French coming-of-age comedy-drama films
French romantic comedy-drama films
Films about families
Films about marriage
British films set in New York City
Films set in 1992
Films set in 1994
Films set in 1996
Films set in 1997
Films set in 1998
StudioCanal films
Working Title Films films
Films scored by Clint Mansell
Films directed by Adam Brooks
Films produced by Eric Fellner
Films produced by Tim Bevan
French films set in New York City
Universal Pictures films
Films about father–daughter relationships
2000s English-language films
2000s American films
2000s British films
2000s French films
2000s German films